Peoria is the name of the following places in the U.S. state of Indiana:
Peoria, Franklin County, Indiana
Peoria, Miami County, Indiana